The Wyvern Mystery is a 2000 BBC TV miniseries directed by Alex Pillai and starring Naomi Watts and Derek Jacobi. The TV series is based on Sheridan Le Fanu's 1869 novel.

Cast
Naomi Watts as Alice
Derek Jacobi as Squire
Iain Glen as Charles
Jack Davenport as Harry
Aisling O'Sullivan as Vrau
Elaine Collins as Dulcie
Ellie Haddington as Mrs Tarnley

External links
 

BBC television dramas
2000 British television series debuts
2000 British television series endings
2000s British drama television series
2000s British mystery television series
2000s British television miniseries
English-language television shows
Films based on works by Sheridan Le Fanu
Television shows based on Irish novels